Alta Gracia Apparel is a living wage apparel company manufacturing that sells licensed collegiate and professional sports apparel to university bookstores and online retailers.  Their factory, located in Villa Altagracia, Dominican Republic is the first and only verified Living Wage company of its kind.

History
The Alta Gracia factory opened in 2010 as a subsidiary of Knights Apparel.  The company was founded with the promise to pays its employees a living wage, as established by the Workers Rights Consortium, for adequate food and shelter, which is about three and a half times the average income of apparel workers in the Dominican Republic. This Living Wage, which is established independently by the WRC (Worker's Rights Consortium) is set to provide a family of four the basic needs of housing, food, healthcare etc.  The factory employs about 150 unionized people who, in 2013, made about $3 per hour, or $500 per month. This compares to the average wage in Bangladesh of $40 to $64 per month, according to a May 2013 survey reported by Reuters.

Alta Gracia is located in a former apparel sweatshop, that made baseball caps for Reebok and Nike until 2007. Its owner, BJ+B moved its clothing manufacture operations to Vietnam and Bangladesh where there were lower employment costs.

Offering workers a fair wage came as the result of co-founders Donnie Hodge and Joe Bozich's response to student concerns regarding conditions under which collegiate apparel were produced.  The Workers Rights Consortium along with student activist groups like the United Students Against Sweatshops,  and James Wilkerson, Director of Trademark Licensing and Stores Operations at Duke University, were early leaders in the movement.

In 2018, the company was acquired by AG Triada and moved headquarters to Atlanta, GA.

Overview
Alta Gracia makes collegiate and professional logo apparel, selling at over 700 collegiate bookstores as well as through online retailers such as Fanatics.  They are the only Living Wage Verified apparel company.

See also
 United Students Against Sweatshops
 Workers Rights Consortium

References

Further reading
 Alta Gracia: Union-Made, Living Wage United Students Against Sweatshops.
 William T. Armaline; Davita Silfen Glasberg; Bandana Purkayastha. Human Rights in Our Own Backyard: Injustice and Resistance in the United States. University of Pennsylvania Press; 14 March 2013. . p. 20.
 Peter Dreir. Alta Gracia: Showing the World What is Possible. Fair World Project. Fall 2012.
 Peter Dreir. "Is the Perfect Factory Possible?". The Nation. October 19, 2011.
 Shae Garwood; Sky Croeser; Christalla Yakinthou. Lessons for Social Change in the Global Economy: Voices from the Field. Lexington Books; 16 December 2013. . p. 13–15, 24–28, 175.
 Susan Jackson; Randall Schuler; Steve Werner. Managing Human Resources. Cengage Learning; 16 June 2011. . Can Knights Apparel Satisfy all of its Stakeholders and Survive?. p. 32–33.
 John M. Klien. Alta Gracia: Branding Decent Work Conditions: Will College Loyalty Embrace “Living Wage” Sweatshirts? Kalmanovitz Initiative for Labor and the Working Poor. Walsh School of Foreign Service. Georgetown University. August 30, 2010
 Gloria Lloyd. "Alta Gracia model shown as 'viable'". Duke Chronicle. Duke University. February 8, 2012.
 Scott Nova; John M. Kline. Workers' Rights and Labor Compliance in Global Supply Chains: Is a Social Label the Answer?. Routledge; 26 November 2013. . Social Labeling and Supply Chain Reform: The Designated Supplier Program and the Alta Gracia Label. p. 262–281.
 Steve Werner; Randall S. Schuler; Susan E. Jackson. Human Resource Management. South-Western Cengage Learning; 2012. . p. 417.
 Tiffany Westrom. "Students Against Sweatshops appeals for Alta Gracia apparel." Iowa State Daily (online edition). March 8, 2012.
 Jake Jarvis. "Sweatshop Worker Shares Story, Hopes to Inspire." The Daily Athenaeum (online edition). March 1, 2016.
 Sarah Adler-Milstein; John M. Kline. ' 'Sewing Hope: How One Factory Challenges the Apparel Industry's Sweatshops''. University of California Press; 2017. .

External links
Official website
Tejid@s Junt@s: Workers, Students, and the movement for Alta Gracia

Clothing companies of the Dominican Republic
Fair trade organizations
Brands of the Dominican Republic